Srikanta may refer to:
 Srikanta Acharya, Bengali singer
 Srikanta Wadiyar (born 1953), Indian prince and politician
 Srikanta (book), a Bengali novel by Sarat Chandra Chattopadhyay
 Srikanta (film), a 2017 Indian Kannada-language romantic action thriller
 Srikanta (mountain) A mountain in Garhwal Himalaya

Indian masculine given names